Aðalheiður Guðmundsdóttir (born 7 March 1965) is an Icelandic professor of medieval Icelandic literature at the University of Iceland.

Career 
Aðalheiður completed her matriculation examination from Verzlunarskóli Íslands in 1986, a BA in Icelandic from the University of Iceland in 1989, a Cand.mag. degree in Icelandic literature in 1993 and a Dr.phil. degree from the same university in 2002. Aðalheiður was a postdoctoral fellow at the Árni Magnússon Institute, funded by the Icelandic Centre for Research, from 2005 to 2007, a Sigurður Nordal research fellow at the same institute
from 2008 to 2009, adjunct lecturer in folkloristics at the University of Iceland from 2009 and a senior lecturer in the same subject from 2012 to 2015. In 2016, she became a professor of Icelandic at the Faculty of Icelandic and Comparative Cultural Studies, University of Iceland.

Aðalheiður has held various positions of trust at the University of Iceland and elsewhere, e.g. head of the Department of Icelandic, board member for the University of Iceland Research Fund, the University of Iceland Centre for Medieval Studies, the Association of Icelandic Language Teachers and the Society of Folklorists (chair). She has participated in many international collaborative projects and teaching staff exchange programmes, having worked as a guest lecturer or exchange teacher at the University of the Faroe Islands, the University of Copenhagen, the University of Tartu, University College Dublin and the University of Rzeszów. She has also been a guest professor at the University of Siena.

She sits on various editorial and consulting boards, e.g. for the journal New Norse Studies: A Journal on the Literature and Culture of Medieval Scandinavia.

Research 
Aðalheiður's main focuses in teaching and research are medieval Norse literature, legendary sagas, folktales, folk ballads and rímur (metrical romances), the history of dance and the history of magic. She has published books such as Úlfhams saga in 2001 and Strengleikar in 2006, as well as many academic papers. Her doctoral thesis, Úlfhams saga, discussed the metrical verses and the derived prose versions of the saga. The saga was adapted for the stage in Hafnarfjörður Theatre by the company Annað svið in 2004 and the opportunity was taken to record the rímur (metrical verses) and publish them on CD along with Aðalheiður's edition of the text, with explanatory notes.

Awards 
In 2016 she was awarded the Dag Strömbäck Prize by the Royal Gustavus Adolphus Academy in Uppsala for her achievements in the field of Norse studies and folkloristics. In 2022 she received the annual Hagþenkir award for academic work of outstanding quality for her two-volume work Arfur aldanna (2021).

Personal life 
Aðalheiður's parents are Guðmundur Þ. Jónasson (born 1942) and Ólöf S. Sigurjónsdóttir (born 1946). She is married to Guðvarður Már Gunnlaugsson, a philologist, and has three children. Aðalheiður has published short stories and poems and has won prizes for her writing.

Bibliography

Books 
Úlfhams saga. (2001). Aðalheiður Guðmundsdóttir sá um útgáfuna og ritaði inngang. Reykjavík: Stofnun Árna Magnússonar á Íslandi (cclxxxi + 63 pp.)
Strengleikar. (2006) Aðalheiður Guðmundsdóttir sá um útgáfuna og ritar inngang. Reykjavík: Bókmenntafræðistofnun Háskóla Íslands.

Articles 
Aðalheiður Guðmundsdóttir. (2018). Reflexes of the fornaldarsögur in Icelandic poetry. In Matthew Driscoll, Silvia Hufnagel, Philip Lavender and Beeke Stegmann (eds.), The legendary legacy: Transmission and reception of the Fornaldarsögur Norðurlanda (pp. 19–51).
Aðalheiður Guðmundsdóttir. (2017). Some Heroic Motifs in Icelandic Art. Scripta Islandica 68: 11–49.
Aðalheiður Guðmundsdóttir. (2016). "How Do You Know if it is Love or Lust?" On Gender, Status, and Violence in Old Norse Literature. Interfaces: A Journal of Medieval European Literatures, 2: 189–209.
Aðalheiður Guðmundsdóttir. (2015). The Narrative Role of Magic in the Fornaldarsögur. ARV - Nordic Yearbook of Folklore (pp. 39–56).
Aðalheiður Guðmundsdóttir. (2012). The Dancers of De la Gardie 11. Mediaeval Studies, 74: 307–330.
Aðalheiður Guðmundsdóttir. (2012). Gunnarr and the Snake Pit in Medieval Art and Legend. Speculum. A Journal of Medieval Studies, 87(4): 1015–1049.
Aðalheiður Guðmundsdóttir. (2007). The Werewolf in Medieval Icelandic literature. Journal of English and Germanic Philology, 106(3): 277–303.
Aðalheiður Guðmundsdóttir. (2006). How Icelandic Legends Reflect the Prohibition on Dancing. ARV - Nordic Yearbook of Folklore, 61: 25–52.
María Ellingsen. (2004). Úlfhamssaga.
Ævintýragrunnur

References 

1965 births
Living people
Adalheidur Gudmundsdottir
Women medievalists
Adalheidur Gudmundsdottir
Adalheidur Gudmundsdottir
Adalheidur Gudmundsdottir
Adalheidur Gudmundsdottir